The Pensacola City Council is the governing body of the City of Pensacola, Florida.

The seven-member council is elected by single-member districts. Council members serve four year terms. Each November, the council elects a council president, who chairs council meetings, as well as a council vice-president. The current council president is Jared Moore.

Members

See also

 Pensacola, Florida
 Pensacola City Hall

References

External links
Official website

Florida city councils
Pensacola, Florida